Seven Sonnets & a Song is the twenty-first studio album by Australian musician, Paul Kelly, which was issued on 22 April 2016 on his own label, Gawdaggie Records, and distributed by Universal Music Australia. Kelly composed music for seven sonnets by William Shakespeare and a poem, "My True Love Hath My Heart", by Philip Sidney. The album debuted at No. 9 on the ARIA Albums Chart, becoming Kelly's fourth top 10. It was nominated for Best Adult Contemporary Album at the ARIA Music Awards of 2016.

Background 

Seven Sonnets & a Song is the twenty-first studio album by Australian musician, Paul Kelly, which was issued on 18 April 2016 on his own label, Gawdaggie Records, and distributed by Universal Music Australia. Kelly had developed the concept of putting Shakespeare's sonnets to music to celebrate the 400th anniversary of the bard's death. Kelly sings lead vocals on six of the album's seven tracks, while Vika Bull (of Vika and Linda) provides lead vocal on "My True Love Hath My Heart", which is based on a poem by Philip Sidney.

Kelly owns a three-volume edition of Complete Works of Shakespeare and explained "Just about anything you want to say, Shakespeare's said it already." Michael Dwyer of The Sydney Morning Herald quoted Kelly "No-one ever did themselves any favours putting their lyrics next to Shakespeare's." United States-Canadian singer-songwriter, Rufus Wainwright, independently undertook a similar project for his album, Take All My Loves: 9 Shakespeare Sonnets (April 2016). Kelly explained "[previously] my own songs came about through music first or making sounds with chords and melodies and trying to get words to fit those sounds. But a few years ago I was involved in a project with a classical composer where I was asked to put poems to music. That was Yeats, Les Murray, Emily Dickinson and a few others, and that turned this key for me."

The album was recorded over five sessions from May 2012 to February 2016, with Kelly co-producing with Steve Schram on six tracks, while "O Mistress Mine (Clown's Song from Twelfth Night)" was co-produced by Kelly with, his nephew, Dan Kelly and J Walker. Music videos were prepared for "Sonnet 73" (directed by Sunny Leunig), "Sonnet 18" (Lucy Dyson) and "My True Love Hath My Heart" (Andy Doherty).

Reception 

On the ARIA Albums Chart, Seven Sonnets & a Song debuted and peaked at No. 9 – it became Kelly's fourth top 10. Kelly's work received his seventh nomination for Best Adult Contemporary Album at the ARIA Music Awards of 2016. AllMusic's Mark Deming rated it as three-and-a-half stars out-of five and explained, "poetry can certainly be adapted to pop songs, and the veteran Australian singer/songwriter [Kelly] has brought us a surprising and effective example of the latter process in action... [he] puts plenty of spirit and soul into the performances... there's a bold, easygoing vigor to this music that seems respectful to both the source material and Kelly's musical instincts."

Rolling Stone Australias Dan Lander gave it four stars out-of five and believes it as has "a strange chemistry" with "the opening strains of 'Sonnet 138' sound like nothing as much as a Paul Kelly song, lyrics and all. Later, 'Sonnet 18' repeats the trick, marrying the timeless struggles of Shakespeare’s love to that shadowy, earthy sound that Kelly has made his own. Elsewhere, 'Sonnets 44 & 45' come together in a haunting piano ballad, while 'Sonnet 60' builds to grandeur from Kelly's idiosyncratic semi-spoken style." He also states "that the only song that doesn't connect" is "My True Love Hath My Heart" which "falls flat amidst an otherwise uplifting album."

Steve Bell on TheMusic.com.au concludes "In lesser hands this could have all been tough going, but Kelly's clear love of Shakespeare meshed with his own unfettered musicality makes this yet another fascinating landmark in his ever-evolving canon." Wainwright opined "It sounds great in a convertible", Kelly responded "That's good. I make all my records to sound good in a convertible, especially."

Track listing

Personnel 

Musicians
 Aaron Barden – violin
 Cameron Bruce – mellotron, organ, piano, vibraphone
 Linda Bull – backing vocals
 Vika Bull – backing vocals, lead vocals (track 4)
 Ross Irwin – string arrangements
 Charlotte Jacke – cello
 Alice Keath – banjo, backing vocals
 Dan Kelly – guitar, backing vocals
 Paul Kelly – acoustic guitar, lead vocals
 Peter Luscombe – drums, tambourine
 Bill McDonald – bass guitar, double bass
 Ashley Naylor – guitars (acoustic, electric)
 Lucky Oceans – pedal steel
 Greg J Walker – autoharp
 Leah Zweck – viola

Recording details
 John Castle – engineering, mixing
 Ross Cockle – mastering
 Dan Kelly – producer (track 7)
 Paul Kelly – producer
 Luke Mullan – assistant engineer
 Steven Schram – engineer, mixing, producer
 Richard Stoltz – engineer
 Greg J Walker – engineer, producer (track 7)

Artwork
 John Castle – photography
 Andy Doherty – photography
 Paul Kelly – liner notes
 Luke Mullan – photography
 Peter Salmon-Lomas – artwork

Chart performance

References 

2016 albums
Paul Kelly (Australian musician) albums